Slovensko Slovákom is a Slovak ethnic nationalist phrase which means "Slovakia belongs to Slovaks". The Slovak People's Party used it as a slogan in favor of Slovak autonomy within Czechoslovakia, anti-Czech sentiment during the Slovak State era, and also an antisemitic message ("Slovensko Slovákom, Palestína Zidom"—"Slovakia belongs to the Slovaks, Jews to Palestine"). In the twenty-first century, it is still used by Slovak nationalists opposed to the EU and by the Kotleba party.

References

Anti-Czech sentiment
Antisemitism in Slovakia
Euroscepticism in Slovakia
Political catchphrases
Racism in Slovakia
Slovak nationalism
Xenophobia in Europe